Prince David Osei (born 6 December 1983) is a Ghanaian actor, model, producer, director and a philanthropist. He has featured in many Ghanaian and Nigerian movies, including Fortune Island,  Last Night, Hero, Forbidden Fruit and others. He has also featured in the American movie titled The Dead.

Personal life 
Family

He is married to Nana Ama Asieduaa.

Filmography 

 Fortune Island
 The Dead
 Last Night
 Hero
 Forbidden Fruit
 Flight by Night

Awards 

 Prince David Osei has won the  Best Actor at the City People Entertainment Awards. He has also won the award for Most Promising Act at the Africa Magic Viewers Choice Awards.
 He won Best Actor for the Lead Role at the African International Film Festival Awards 2019 in Dallas, United States of America .

References 

Living people
1983 births
Ghanaian male film actors
21st-century Ghanaian male actors